Mladen Šekularac (born January 29, 1981) is a Montenegrin basketball coach and former professional player.

Playing career 
At one point Šekularac was considered to be one of the biggest European talents and was projected as NBA draft lottery pick candidate. His reputation was such that his club at the time, KK FMP, put a €1.3 million price tag on his transfer. However, inconsistent form and unsteady overall progress made many uncertain about his potential.

He was an early entry candidate for the 2000 and 2001 NBA drafts before withdrawing each time. He stayed, however, in the 2002 NBA draft and ended up being taken in the second round with the 55th pick by the Dallas Mavericks. They traded his rights to the Golden State Warriors in 2004.

Šekularac never played a game in the NBA and is 1 of 9 players from the 2002 NBA Draft to never play a game in the league.

See also 
 List of NBA drafted players from Serbia

External links
 Mladen Šekularac at legabasket.it
 Mladen Šekularac at euroleague.net
 Coach Profile at eurobasket.com

1981 births
Living people
Antwerp Giants players
Apollon Patras B.C. players
Dallas Mavericks draft picks
Greek Basket League players
KK Budućnost players
KK FMP (1991–2011) players
KK Mornar Bar players
KK Sloboda Užice coaches
KK Zlatibor coaches
KK Zlatibor players
Medalists at the 1999 Summer Universiade
Montenegrin expatriate basketball people in Belgium
Montenegrin expatriate basketball people in France
Montenegrin expatriate basketball people in Greece
Montenegrin expatriate basketball people in Italy
Montenegrin expatriate basketball people in Serbia
Montenegrin men's basketball players
People from Bar, Montenegro
Small forwards
Spirou Charleroi players
Universiade medalists in basketball
Universiade silver medalists for Serbia and Montenegro
Virtus Bologna players